Judge Love may refer to:

James M. Love (1820–1891), judge of the United States District Courts for the District of Iowa and the Southern District of Iowa
John Love (judge) (fl. 1990s–2020s), magistrate judge of the United States District Court for the Eastern District of Texas
William D. Love (1859–1933), judge of the United States Board of Tax Appeals